Kiddle may refer to the following:

 Kiddle (search engine), safe search engine for kids
 Kiddle (surname), a surname of English origin
 An old name for a fishing weir
 Liddle Kiddles, dolls originally produced by toymakers Mattel Inc. in 1965

See also 
 
 Kiddo (disambiguation)
 Kittle (disambiguation)